is a National College of Technology (Kosen) with a five-year technical curriculum.

The college is signatory to the JABEE (Accreditation System for Engineering Education in Japan) since 2005, which is signatory to the Washington Accord.

History 

1963.04  Toyota National College of Technology was established (Department of Mechanical Engineering, Department of Electrical Engineering, and Department of Architecture).  
1968.04  Department of Civil Engineering was added. A boarding system was adopted for students in lower grades.  
1979.03  Data Station was opened.  
1983.06  Strength Test Center for Materials and Structure was established.
1987.04  Department of Information and Computer Engineering was added.  
1993.04  The Reorganization of Department of Civil Engineering.  
1994.04  Advanced Engineering Courses were established. Courses of Electronic and Mechanical Engineering, Civil Engineering and Architecture, Computer Science were established. 
1996.07  Data Station was reorganized into Multimedia Center for Information Processing.  
1999.04  Department of Electrical Engineering was renamed Department of Electrical and Electronic Engineering.  
2002.10  Collaboration Research Center of Technology was established.  
2004.04  Techno-training Center for Manufacturing ("Monodukuri" Center) was established.

References

External links 
Toyota National College of Technology Homepage (English)
Toyota National College of Technology Homepage (日本語 / Japanese)

Japanese national universities
Engineering universities and colleges in Japan
Universities and colleges in Aichi Prefecture
Technical universities and colleges in Japan
Educational institutions established in 1963
1963 establishments in Japan
Toyota, Aichi